Farid Wajdi is a member and current spokesperson for the Judicial Commission of Indonesia. Wajdi has publicly pushed for greater checks and balances on the Judiciary of Indonesia.

References 

Living people
21st-century Indonesian lawyers
Year of birth missing (living people)